NISD may refer to:
Nacogdoches Independent School District
Navarro Independent School District
Navasota Independent School District
Nederland Independent School District
Northside Independent School District